Brandon J. Salerno is a baseball coach and former catcher, who is the current pitching coach for the St. Bonaventure Bonnies. He played college baseball at St. Bonaventure from 2006 to 2009 for head coach Larry Sudbrook. He served as the head coach of the  St. Bonaventure Bonnies (2022).

Playing career
Salerno went to Warren Area High School in Warren, Pennsylvania, where he played catcher.

Salerno attended the St. Bonaventure University in St. Bonaventure, New York. He was a member of the St. Bonaventure baseball team.

Coaching career
Salerno joined the coaching staff at Jamestown Community College. The following season, Salerno joined his alma mater, St. Bonaventure, as pitching and catching coach.

On October 12, 2021, Salerno was named the interim head baseball coach of the Bonnies, effective January 1, 2022, when Sudbrook would officially retire. Salerno was not retained as head coach after posting a 5–39 record in 2022. New head coach Jason Rathbun retained Salerno as the team's pitching coach.

Head coaching record

References

External links
St. Bonaventure Bonnies bio

Living people
Jamestown Jayhawks baseball coaches
St. Bonaventure Bonnies baseball coaches
St. Bonaventure Bonnies baseball players
Year of birth missing (living people)